Darío Cvitanich (born 16 May 1984) is a retired Argentine professional footballer who played as a striker.

Career

Banfield

Cvitanich started his career in Club Atlético Banfield's youth and made his debut for the club's first team at the age of 19 on 20 October 2003 in a 3–1 defeat to Olimpo de Bahía Blanca. He scored a hat-trick in a 4–0 win against Newell's Old Boys on 27 April 2007. He played, and scored, for Banfield in the Copa Libertadores 2007. He also served as a loyal member of Banfield during his early youth years in Argentina. Just prior to leaving his childhood side, he excelled his final loyalty by scoring 13 times during Banfield's run at the Clausura 2008 tournament.

Ajax

Cvitanich signed for Ajax, although he did not leave Banfield until the end of the 2008 season. He was labelled the successor to Klaas-Jan Huntelaar and scored his first goal against NAC Breda on 12 December 2008. Following the match against NAC, Cvitanich scored his first brace and his first hat-trick in subsequent weeks against De Graafschap and ADO Den Haag. He scored his first hat-trick of the 2009–10 season against NAC Breda.

Loan to Pachuca

Cvitanich joined Mexican side Pachuca on a year's loan on 1 January 2010. He helped the Mexican side to win their fourth CONCACAF Champions League title, and returned to Ajax on 3 November 2010, helping the club win their 30th Dutch league title.

Loan to Boca Juniors

Cvitanich signed with Boca Juniors in July 2011, on a one-year loan deal. He scored his first goal for Boca on 28 August 2011, against San Lorenzo de Almagro.
Cvitanich scored again in the last games of the tournament against Godoy Cruz, two goals against Banfield and one against All Boys. He won the 2011 Argentine Torneo Apertura with Boca Juniors, as well as help the team to place in the final of the 2012 Copa Libertadores, where they faced Corinthians from Brazil. Cvitanich was also voted Copa Libertadores player of the week, in the 10th week of the tournament in April.

OGC Nice
On 25 July 2012, Cvitanich joined French Ligue 1 outfit OGC Nice on a three-year contract.

Return to Pachuca

On 5 January 2015, Cvitanich joined Mexican Liga MX club Pachuca.

After having a second knee injury and as a consequence missed the rest of the tournament, Pachuca agreed to released him from the team and hired Franco Jara as his replacement.

Career statistics

International career
Cvitanich was born in Argentina with distant Croatian heritage. He established himself as a quality footballer in his home country playing for Banfield in the Argentine Primera División. After much consideration he eventually pledged to play for the Croatia national team, stating that "such an opportunity only comes once and you must take it."
It became known on 14 January 2009 that he couldn't play for Croatia, because the FIFA rules do not allow nationality to be taken from great grandparents.

In the case of the striker, only one of his great-grandparents was being born at the Croatian territories and later emigrated to Argentina.

Neither that nor his typical surname from Croatia will be able to help him against FIFA.

Cvitanich obtained the Croatian passport back in 2008, but that's not a sufficient argument for the FIFA.

Personal life
Cvitanich obtained a Croatian passport in August 2008. He has dual citizenship, holding both Argentinean and Croatian passports.
The surname Cvitanić has his origin on the island of Brač. During the last century, every tenth citizen of the island was one of the family of the Cvitanić's.

Honours
Pachuca
CONCACAF Champions League: 2009–10

Ajax
Eredivisie: 2010–11

Boca Juniors
Primera División: 2011 Apertura
Copa Argentina: 2012

Racing Club
Primera División: 2018–19

Individual
Argentine Primera División top scorer: 2008 Clausura

References

External links

 
 Argentine Primera statistics at Futbol XXI 
 Israel article 
 

1984 births
Living people
Argentine footballers
Argentine expatriate footballers
Argentine people of Croatian descent
Association football forwards
People from Baradero
Sportspeople from Buenos Aires Province
Citizens of Croatia through descent
Club Atlético Banfield footballers
AFC Ajax players
C.F. Pachuca players
OGC Nice players
Miami FC players
Racing Club de Avellaneda footballers
Argentine Primera División players
Eredivisie players
Liga MX players
Ligue 1 players
North American Soccer League players
Argentine expatriate sportspeople in Mexico
Argentine expatriate sportspeople in the Netherlands
Argentine expatriate sportspeople in France
Argentine expatriate sportspeople in the United States
Expatriate footballers in Mexico
Expatriate footballers in the Netherlands
Expatriate footballers in France
Expatriate soccer players in the United States